Govindan Lakshmanan (born 5 June 1990 in Sokkurani, Pudukottai district, Tamil Nadu, India) is an Indian distance runner. On the track, he mostly competes over 5000 metres and 10,000 metres, but has also run the half marathon competitively.

Early life 
Lakshmanan lost his father to a car accident when he was six, and was adopted by his neighbour S. Loganathan. His mother Jayalakshmi is a small farmer. Under Loganathan's tutelage, Lakshmanan began training in long-distance running when he was 16, along with the former's daughter Suriya, in Youth Sports Club in the village of Kavinadu near the town of Pudukkottai in Tamil Nadu.

Career 
He represented India at the 2015 IAAF World Cross Country Championships, placing 74th overall. Competing over 5000 metres at the 2015 Wuhan Asian Championships, Lakshmanan won the bronze medal with a time of 13:36.62. He won the 10,000 metres silver medal with a time of 29:42.81. At the next Championships, he won the 5000 metres gold medal with a time of 14:54.48, becoming only the third Indian to win gold in the event at the Championships, and the first since 1993. The time was however the slowest in the Championships' history for a winner. The victory earned him a qualification for the London World Championships that year. In London, he ran his personal best of 13:35.69.

At the 2018 Asian Games in Jakarta, Indonesia; he won bronze medal but was later stripped as he was disqualified for lane infringement.

References

External links
 

1990 births
Living people
People from Pudukkottai district
Athletes from Tamil Nadu
Indian male long-distance runners
Indian male cross country runners
Asian Games competitors for India
Athletes (track and field) at the 2018 Asian Games
World Athletics Championships athletes for India
Tamil sportspeople